Hymenobacter actinosclerus  is a bacterium from the genus of Hymenobacter which has been isolated from pork chops.

References

Further reading

External links
Type strain of Hymenobacter actinosclerus at BacDive -  the Bacterial Diversity Metadatabase	

actinosclerus
Bacteria described in 2000